Robert Waters (29 April 1874 – 20 February 1912) was an Australian cricketer. He played in four first-class matches for South Australia between 1901 and 1903.

See also
 List of South Australian representative cricketers

References

External links
 

1874 births
1912 deaths
Australian cricketers
Cricketers from Kent
South Australia cricketers